Ranjan is a Marathi feature film released on 17 February 2017. Written and directed by Prakash Pawar, Ranjan explores the teenage love story of a school going boy and girl.

Cast                                                      

 Yash Kulkarni 
 Gauri Kulkarni 
 Pushkar Lonarkar
 Anil Nagarkar 
 Bhalchandra Kadam 
 Bharat Ganeshpure 
 Kishor Salvi

References 

2010s Marathi-language films